or  is a lake that lies in the municipality of Grane in Nordland county, Norway.  The  lake lies between the lakes Majavatnet and Storsvenningvatnet.  European route E6 and the Nordland Line both run along the eastern edge of the lake.

See also
 List of lakes in Norway
 Geography of Norway

References

Lakes of Nordland
Grane, Nordland